United Poland (abbreviated to SP, lit. "Solidary Poland", alternatively translated as "Solidarity Poland") is a Catholic-nationalist political party in Poland led by Zbigniew Ziobro. It was founded in 2012, as the Catholic-nationalist split from the Law and Justice, with whom they later formed the United Right alliance in 2014.

Ideology 
The party has been described as national-conservative, nationalist, and Catholic-nationalist. It is also staunchly socially conservative. It is opposed to abortion and euthanasia, and supports extending maternity leave to nine months. It is eurosceptic, and its staunch opposition to same-sex marriage was cited as a main reason it left the ECR group in the European Parliament in 2012. It has been also described as right-wing populist mainly due to their opposition to immigration. It has been described as right-wing, and far-right.

In its 2013 program, United Poland called for government intervention in the economy, especially tax policy. The party has called for a 'fat cat' tax on big companies, including supermarkets, and backs higher taxes on those that earn over 10,000 złotych (€2,400) a month. It opposes the construction of a nuclear power plant in Poland.

In 2022 United Poland called for tougher blasphemy laws in Poland, such as three-year jail terms for insulting church or interrupting mass.

History
After Ziobro and fellow MEPs Tadeusz Cymański and Jacek Kurski were ejected from PiS for disloyalty on 4 November 2011, Ziobro's supporters within PiS formed a new group in the Sejm.  Despite claims that the new group was not attempting to form a new party, the MPs were expelled from Law and Justice. The party was founded in 2012 by Law and Justice (PiS) MEP Zbigniew Ziobro, who led the party's conservative Catholic-nationalist faction.

In 2012, their MEPs left the European Conservatives and Reformists (ECR) to join the Europe of Freedom and Democracy (EFD) group in opposition to the ECR's more liberal stance on gay marriage, its support for the EU's climate change policy, and its advocacy of cuts to the Common Agricultural Policy.

The party was officially launched on 24 March 2012.  At the time, opinion polls put the party just around 2%. In a 2020 poll, it found that if the party ran independent from the United Right it would gain 5.4% votes.

Representatives

Members of the Sejm

 Andrzej Dera (36 – Kalisz)
 Mieczysław Golba (20 – Krosno)
 Patryk Jaki (21 – Opole)
 Beata Kempa (33 – Kielce)
 Arkadiusz Mularczyk (14 – Nowy Sącz)
 Józef Rojek (15 – Tarnów)

 Andrzej Romanek (14 – Nowy Sącz)
 Edward Siarka (14 – Nowy Sącz)
 Tadeusz Woźniak (11 – Sieradz)
 Jan Ziobro (15 – Tarnów)
 Kazimierz Ziobro (20 – Krosno)
 Jarosław Żaczek (6 – Lublin)

Election results

Sejm

Presidential

Footnotes

External links

 United Poland official website

 
Political parties in Poland
Right-wing populist parties
Far-right political parties in Poland
2012 establishments in Poland
Right-wing parties in Europe